Sandy Springs is an unincorporated community in Robertson County, Tennessee, in the United States.

References

Unincorporated communities in Robertson County, Tennessee
Unincorporated communities in Tennessee